"Sag mir – Was meinst du?" is a song by German recording artist Yvonne Catterfeld. Initially titled "I Believe", it was written by Vinny Vero, Carl Sahlin, Peter Modén, Peter Ledin, and Kerima Holm, while production was helmed by Hearsay for Multiplay Music. Catterfeld re-wrote the in German along with Björn Wiese and Britta A. Blum.

Formats and track listings

Charts

References

External links
 YvonneCatterfeld.com – official site

2004 singles
2004 songs
Yvonne Catterfeld songs
Hansa Records singles